Ditopella is a genus of fungi in the family Gnomoniaceae.

Species 

 D. asclepiadea
 D. cryptosphaeria
 D. ditopa
 D. farcta
 D. fusispora
 D. hosackiae
 D. kajiana
 D. koschkelovae
 D. microscopica
 D. obducens
 D. populi
 D. vizeana

References

External links 

 Ditopella at Index Fungorum

Gnomoniaceae
Sordariomycetes genera